Lew Frederick (born December 1951) is an American Democratic politician, currently representing District 22 in the Oregon Senate.

Early life and education
Born in Pullman, Washington, Frederick grew up in Baton Rouge, Louisiana, and Atlanta, Georgia. Frederick is the son of botanist Dr. Lafayette Frederick, Professor Emeritus Howard University, and his wife Antoinette Reed Frederick. Frederick has lived in northeast Portland since 1974.

Career 
Throughout his career, he was a teacher at the Metropolitan Learning Center for two years, a radio and television reporter with KGW for seventeen years, Director of Public Information at Portland Public Schools for thirteen years, Assistant to the President at Portland Community College, and held a position on the State Board of Education. In October 2013, Frederick was awarded the Outstanding Alumni Award at Earlham College.

Frederick was sworn into the Oregon House of Representatives in October 2009 and began serving on the House Interim Human Services Committee and House Interim Sustainability & Economic Development Committee.

According to the Portland Tribune, he was Oregon's "highest-ranking black leader and the only black man serving in the Oregon Legislature" as of 2010. Commissioner Amanda Fritz and The Skanner endorsed Frederick during his campaign for District 43.
Frederick, formerly a member of the House Joint Committee on Legislative Audits, Information Management and Technology, has moved into the leadership ranks through his new Committee assignments. Frederick's 2013 Regular Session assignments are as Vice-Chair, Land Use Committee; and both the Ways and Means Committee, per se, as well as the Ways and Means Subcommittee On Education.

Lew Frederick maintains a research and strategy affiliation with the California and Washington, D.C.-based company, The Rand Reed Group, an applied anthropological consultancy run by Kathleen Rand Reed.

Fredrick supports reparations for the descendants of slaves, and on January 11, 2021 proposed Oregon State Bill 619 to direct the Oregon Department of Revenue to pay individuals who could demonstrate heritage in slavery $123,000 as an annual annuity. Despite misreporting and misreading to the contrary, SB 619 would create an annuity of $123,000 which is paid annually, rather than a sum of $123,000 paid annually.

See also 
 76th Oregon Legislative Assembly

References

External links
 Official site

1951 births
Living people
21st-century American politicians
African-American state legislators in Oregon
Journalists from Portland, Oregon
Democratic Party members of the Oregon House of Representatives
Democratic Party Oregon state senators
Portland Community College faculty
21st-century African-American politicians
20th-century African-American people
African-American history in Portland, Oregon